"The Floor" is a song by American singer-songwriter Johnny Gill from his fourth studio album, Provocative (1993). The track, a dance and funk song, was written and produced by Jimmy Jam and Terry Lewis and was released as the lead single from Provocative on May 4, 1993, through the Motown label. American band Mint Condition performs the "floor" chants on the song, with member Stokley providing additional background vocals.

Upon its release, "The Floor" peaked at number 56 on the US Billboard Hot 100 and became a top-40 hit in Australia and New Zealand. In Australia, it was certified gold for shipping over 35,000 copies. The song's music video, directed by English video director Julien Temple, features Gill and his backup dancers on a smoky dance floor built like a trampoline.

Chart performance
"The Floor" debuted on the US Billboard Hot 100 on May 22, 1993, as that week's "Hot Shot Debut". Four weeks later, on June 19, the song peaked at number 56, becoming Johnny Gill's second-lowest-charting solo single in the US, after "Wrap My Body Tight". It spent 10 weeks on the Hot 100 before leaving the chart. It became a top-20 hit on the Billboard Hot R&B Singles chart, reaching number 11, and also appeared on two other Billboard rankings: the Rhythmic chart (number 32) and the Dance Singles Sales chart (number 49). On the Canadian RPM Dance chart, the song peaked at number eight for two weeks.

Outside North America, "The Floor" charted in Australia, the Netherlands, New Zealand, and the United Kingdom. It spent a single week on the UK Singles Chart at number 53 and reached number 45 in the Netherlands, where it charted for three weeks. In New Zealand, the song debuted at number 34 on July 18, 1993, and peaked at number 29 during its fourth of five weeks on the RIANZ Singles Chart. It charted the highest in Australia, where it logged 23 weeks on the ARIA Singles Chart, reaching number six on October 10, 1993. It was Australia's 29th-most-successful single of 1993 and was certified gold by the Australian Recording Industry Association (ARIA) for shipping over 35,000 copies.

Music video
Julien Temple directed the music video for "The Floor" and filmed it in May 1993. It was choreographed by Michael Brown and Taco. The video features Gill and many backup dancers dancing on a foggy, multitiered dance floor with a built-in trampoline. According to Temple, he wanted the video to go along with the songs lyrics by "exploring the floor". Gill, who was 27 at the time of filming, was not in prime condition to perform the acrobatic moves in the video and spent most of his time with a masseuse who tended to his injuries.

Track listings

US cassette single
A1. "The Floor" (LP version)
B1. "Tell Me How You Want It" (snippet)
B2. "Long Way from Home" (snippet)
B3. "I Got You" (snippet)
B4. "Quiet Time to Play" (snippet)
B5. "I Know Where I Stand" (snippet)

UK 7-inch and cassette single, Australian cassette single
 "The Floor" (pop edit 1)
 "The Floor" (LP version)

UK CD and 12-inch single, Australian CD single
 "The Floor" (pop edit 1)
 "The Floor" (Flyte Tyme edit)
 "The Floor" (LP version)
 "The Floor" (R&B edit)
 "The Floor" (instrumental)

Personnel
Personnel are adapted from the US cassette single sleeve.
 James Harris III – writing, production
 Terry Lewis – writing, background vocals, production
 Johnny Gill – vocals, background vocals
 Stockley – background vocals
 Mint Condition – "floor" chants
 Jheryl Busby – executive production

Charts

Weekly charts

Year-end charts

Certifications

Release history

References

1993 singles
1993 songs
American dance songs
Funk songs
Johnny Gill songs
Motown singles
Music videos directed by Julien Temple
Song recordings produced by Jimmy Jam and Terry Lewis
Songs written by Jimmy Jam and Terry Lewis